Quien Contra Mí 2 is the sixth studio album by Puerto Rican singer and songwriter Yandel, member of the duo Wisin & Yandel. It was released on July 31, 2020, by Y Entertainment and Sony Music Latin. The album contains 22 songs with features from 28 guests including J Balvin, Rubén Blades, and Snoop Dogg, among others. The album serves as the sequel to Yandel's debut album Quien Contra Mí and nearly approaches the 17th anniversary.

Background
Yandel commented on the process of the album, by saying,

Track listing
Track listing adapted from Tidal.

Notes
  signifies a co-producer
  signifies an additional producer

Sample Credits
 "Dembow 2020" contains a sample of "Dembow", performed by Yandel.
 "Por Mi Reggae Muero 2020" contains a sample of "Por Mi Reggae Muero", performed by Wisin & Yandel.

Charts

Weekly charts

Year-end charts

Certifications

References

2020 albums
Yandel albums
Spanish-language albums
Sony Music Latin albums
Albums by Puerto Rican artists